Highland Haven is a city in Burnet County, Texas, United States. The population was 431 at the 2010 census.

Geography

Demographics

As of the census of 2000, there were 450 people, 226 households, and 169 families residing in the city. The population density was 1,061.0 people per square mile (413.7/km2). There were 272 housing units at an average density of 641.3/sq mi (250.0/km2). The racial makeup of the city was 98.00% White, 0.89% Native American, 0.22% Asian, 0.44% from other races, and 0.44% from two or more races. Hispanic or Latino of any race were 4.44% of the population.

There were 226 households, out of which 8.8% had children under the age of 18 living with them, 70.8% were married couples living together, 3.1% had a female householder with no husband present, and 24.8% were non-families. 21.7% of all households were made up of individuals, and 17.7% had someone living alone who was 65 years of age or older. The average household size was 1.99 and the average family size was 2.25.

In the city, the population was spread out, with 8.9% under the age of 18, 0.4% from 18 to 24, 11.3% from 25 to 44, 31.1% from 45 to 64, and 48.2% who were 65 years of age or older. The median age was 64 years. For every 100 females, there were 94.8 males. For every 100 females age 18 and over, there were 87.2 males.

The median income for a household in the city was $54,375, and the median income for a family was $59,792. Males had a median income of $32,125 versus $23,125 for females. The per capita income for the city was $30,528. About 1.2% of families and 0.9% of the population were below the poverty line, including none of those under age 18 and 1.9% of those age 65 or over.

See also
 Marble Falls Independent School District

References

External links
 City of Highland Haven official website
 

Cities in Burnet County, Texas
Cities in Texas